The United Professional Basketball League (UPBL) is a defunct American professional basketball league. It included teams from the states of Kentucky, Ohio, and West Virginia. so In 2003, the league folded and its remaining teams joined the North American Basketball League (NABL).

Former teams
 Mansfield (OH) Hawks
 Kentucky Coyotes
 Frankfort (KY) Statesmen
 Louisville (KY) Eagles
 West Virginia Miners

References

Defunct basketball leagues in the United States
Basketball in Kentucky
Basketball in Ohio
Basketball in West Virginia
Sports leagues disestablished in 2003
2003 disestablishments in the United States